Thymallus yaluensis is a putative species of freshwater fish, a grayling in the salmon family Salmonidae. It is endemic to the upper Yalu River in Korea, on the Chinese border.

Thymallus yaluensis is a small fish, the maximum recorded length is 20 cm (8 in). "It has the most beautiful form and fins of a freshwater fish" in Korea.

Some confusion exists about the identity of T. yaluensis. It is very similar in form to the Arctic grayling T. arcticus, and has mostly been treated as a subspecies, T. a. yaluensis, although FishBase treats it as an independent species.  According to mitochondrial DNA, it is, however, inseparable from the Amur grayling T. grubii, and was suggested to be a junior synonym of that.

Confusingly, it has also been reported from widely separate regions including Siberia, the Alps in Europe, and the northern Mississippi River drainage in North America.

References

Thymallus
Taxa named by Tamezo Mori
Fish described in 1928